Melodifestivalen 2015 was the Swedish music competition that selected Sweden's 55th entry for the Eurovision Song Contest 2015. Måns Zelmerlöw won with the song "Heroes". The hosts for the show were Sanna Nielsen (winner of Melodifestivalen 2014) and comedian Robin Paulsson.

For the fourteenth consecutive year, the competition consisted of four heats, a "Second Chance" round, and a final. However, the total number of competing entries was reduced from 32 to 28. The 28 competing entries were divided into four heats, with seven compositions in each. From each semifinal, the songs that earned first and second place went directly to the final, while the songs that placed third and fourth proceeded to the Second Chance round. The bottom three songs in each semifinal were eliminated from the competition.

A new rule for the 2015 edition of the competition stipulated that at least 50% of the selected entries were to be written by female composers or lyricists in a full or partial capacity.

Format 
Melodifestivalen 2015 was the fourteenth consecutive year in which the competition will take place in different cities across Sweden. The four semifinals were held in Gothenburg (7 February), Malmö (14 February), Östersund (21 February) and Örebro (28 February). The Second Chance round took place in Helsingborg on 7 March while the final in Solna was held on 14 March.

Schedule and ratings

Competing entries

Heats

Heat 1 
The results of this heat were contest after the crash of the application.

Heat 2

Heat 3

Heat 4

Second Chance 
The Second Chance (Andra chansen) round was held on 7 March 2015 in Helsingborg Arena, Helsingborg. Unlike in the previous editions, four out of eight competing entries were sent to the final this year. The preliminary two-phase voting introduced in 2013 was eliminated, bringing back a duel-only competition. The duels are as follows:

It was announced that Malena Ernman, Melodifestivalen winner and Sweden's representative at the 2009 Eurovision Song Contest would join Behrang Miri and Victor Crone on stage to do the opera vocals.

Final
The grand final of this year's Melodifestivalen was held on 14 March in the 28,000-seat Friends Arena in Solna.
Unlike in the previous editions of Melodifestivalen, twelve songs competed in this year's final, two more than before. Eight finalists were selected during the four-week semi finals and four from the Second Chance round.

References

External links
 Melodifestivalen Official Site
 Reports and pics of Melodifestivalen 

Eurovision
2015
Eurovision Song Contest 2015
2015 in Swedish music
2015 song contests
February 2015 events in Europe
March 2015 events in Europe
Events in Gothenburg
Events at Malmö Arena
Events in Helsingborg
Events in Örebro
Events in Östersund
2010s in Malmö
2010s in Gothenburg
Events in Solna